The Dying Swan is a 1917 drama film directed by Yevgeni Bauer and starring Vera Karalli, Aleksandr Kheruvimov, Vitold Polonsky, Andrej Gromov, and Ivane Perestiani.

Plot 
Gizella, who is a dancer and mute, falls in love with Victor, whom she met at the lake. She believes that love is mutual, but then sees Victor with another girl after he cancels a date with her.

She becomes an object of sympathy for the artist Glinsky, who sees Gizella dancing The Dying Swan and uses her as a model for a picture on the theme of death.

Starring 
 Vera Karalli as Gizella — Gizella — mute dancer
 Aleksandr Kheruvimov as Gizella's Father
 Vitold Polonsky as Viktor Krasovsky
 Andrej Gromov as Valeriy Glinskiy — the artist
 Ivane Perestiani as Glinskiy's friend

References

External links 
 

1917 films
1910s Russian-language films
Russian silent films
Russian black-and-white films
Films of the Russian Empire
Russian drama films
1917 drama films
Silent drama films